The Sarno, known as Sarnus to the Romans, is a stream that passes through Pompeii to the south of the Italian city of Naples. It is considered the most polluted river in Europe.

It is still partially used for irrigation, as well as the transportation of goods and fishing.

The Sarno is one the most polluted rivers in Europe, due to agricultural waste and insufficiently treated industrial waste water. 

There are about 500 small industrial units in the area which still emit pollute. Water treatment plants have been installed, however, they do not work to full capacity. The mouth of the river continues to make bathing in the sea impossible, despite numerous protests.

The plain at the mouth of the river was the site of the Battle of the Sarno, fought in 1460.

References

External links
 Sarno River: Italy
SOURCE: National Geospatial-Intelligence Agency, Bethesda, MD, USA

Rivers of the Province of Naples
Rivers of the Province of Salerno
Rivers of Italy
Drainage basins of the Tyrrhenian Sea